Good Angels Košice, since 2018 playing as Young Angels Košice is a women's basketball team based in Košice that plays in Slovakia's domestic league and FIBA Europe’s EuroLeague Women. The team bears the name of a non-profit charitable organization Dobrý anjel (translated as Good Angel). In the 2012-2013 season they reach the final four of the Euroleague for women.

Winners
Middle European League(2): 2013, 2014
Eastern European Women's Basketball League(2): 2017, 2018
Slovak Women's Basketball Extraliga(15): 2004-2018
Slovak Women's Basketball Cup(13): 2003, 2004, 2007-2016, 2018

Current roster

Out on loan

Notable players

  Iveta Bieliková (2005–2005)
  Katarína Hricková (2008–2012)
  Luisa Michulková (−2008,2009–2010)
  Alena Kováčová (−2010)
  Zuzana Žirková (2010–2018)
  Ivana Jalčová (−2011)
  Daniela Číkošová (−2011)
  Jana Čarnoká (−2012)
   Erin Lawless (2009–2012)
  Lucia Kupčíková (−2014)
  Janka Minčíková (2007-2009,2014-2015)
  Kelly Mazzante (2006–2007)
  Janel McCarville (2006–2008)
  Cathrine Kraayeveld (2008–2009)
  Angel McCoughtry (2009–2010)
  Candice Dupree (2010–2011)
  Charde Houston (2010–2011)
  Ashley Shields (2011–2011)
  Crystal Langhorne (2011–2011,2014-2014)
  Kayla Pedersen (2011–2012)
  Danielle McCray (2011–2012)
  Riquna Williams (2012–2012)
  A'dia Mathies (2013–2013)
  Plenette Pierson (2012–2014)
  Jia Perkins (2014–2014)
  Lynetta Kizer (2014–2014)
  Sugar Rodgers (2015–2015)
  Miljana Bojović (2010-2014)
  Marina Solopova (2011–2011)
  Natalia Vieru (2011–2012)
  Helena Sverrisdóttir (2011–2013, 2018)
  Petra Kulichová (2012–2013)
  Natasha Lacy (2012–2013)
  Alexandria Quigley (2012–2013)
  Yelena Leuchanka (2013–2014)
  Farhiya Abdi (2013–2014)
  Erin Phillips (2014–2015)
  Tijana Krivacevic (2012–2015)

References

External links
Official site
FIBA team page

EuroLeague Women clubs
Women's basketball teams in Slovakia
Basketball teams established in 2001
2001 establishments in Slovakia
Sport in Košice